"Dear Mom" was a 1941 World War II song with words and music by Maury Coleman Harris released by Republic Music Corp. The song was inspired by the 1940 Selective Service Act. The original recording was by Sammy Kaye and his Orchestra, with vocals by Allan Foster from the Victor Records stable. This was overshadowed by a recording in 1942 by Glenn Miller.

The lyrics take the form of a "Dear Mom.." letter from a serviceman:

Bronco song
A version of the song with changed lyrics later became current as the "Dear Mom" Bronco song, after the OV-10 Bronco, among US pilots in the Vietnam War. Retaining the "Dear Mom" letter beginning the author changes from the son, to "Dear Ma'am," from a fellow pilot informing her of the death of her son in action:

References

1941 songs
Glenn Miller songs
Songs about letters (message)
Songs about the military
Songs of the Vietnam War
Songs of World War II